Suvizumab is an antiviral and immunomodulator. It binds to HIV-1.

References 

Monoclonal antibodies
Experimental drugs